Galería Caribe (English: Caribbean Gallery) is the eighth studio album recorded by Guatemalan singer-songwriter Ricardo Arjona, It was released by Sony Music México on August 29, 2000 (see 2000 in music). and became his first number-one album in the Billboard Top Latin Albums chart, peaking at the top of the chart in 2000 and 2001.

Reception

The Allmusic review by Jason Birchmeier awarded the album 3 stars stating "All in all, Galería Caribe is a curious entry in Arjona's catalog that most fans can overlook without missing much."

Track listing
All songs were written by Ricardo Arjona, except where noted.

 "Carabelas" (Caravels) – 2:32
 "Mujer de Guanahani" (Woman From Guanahani) (Arjona, Angel "Cuco" Peña) – 3:42
 "Lo Poco Que Queda de Mi" (What Little is Left Of Me) – 4:56
 "Un Caribe en Nueva York" (A Caribbean in New York) – 5:24
 "Cuando" (When) – 4:34
 "Receta" (Prescription) – 4:52
 "Sólo Quería un Café" (I Just Wanted A Coffee) – 3:50
 "Mesias" (Messiah) – 4:41
 "Te Enamoraste de Ti" (You Fell in Love With You) – 4:27
 "Lo Poco Que Queda de Mi (Acoustic)" – 4:34
 "Si Usted la Viera (El Confesor)" (If You See Her (The Confessor)) (Eusebio Blasco, Jorge Luis Chacín) – 4:18
 "Receta (Acoustic)" – 4:23
 "Pensar en Ti" (Think of You) – 4:22
 "Pensar en Ti (Acoustic)" – 4:03
 "Cuando (Pop version)" – 4:19
 "Te Enamoraste de Ti (Acoustic)" – 4:09
 "Sólo Quería un Café (Acoustic)" – 3:26
 "Porque Hablamos (featuring Ednita Nazario)" (Because We Talk) – 4:41
 "A Cara O Cruz" (Face Or Cross) – 3:42 (Spain Bonus Track)

Personnel
 Ricardo Arjona – vocals
 Cucco Peña – Arreglos Direccion
 Fernando Muscolo – Arreglos Piano Teclados

Singles
Cuando
Lo Poco Que Queda de Mi
Mesias
A Cara O Cruz
Porque Hablamos (featuring Ednita Nazario) (Spain only)

Chart performance

Sales and certifications

References

2000 albums
Ricardo Arjona albums
Spanish-language albums
Sony Music Mexico albums